Robot Series may refer to:
A series of video games made for the R.O.B. Nintendo Entertainment System accessory
The Robot series of short stories and novels by Isaac Asimov
a genre of anime where the TV series is focused on robots
 Super Robot subgenre
 Real Robot subgenre

See also
 Robot (disambiguation)